Astou Sy (born 11 December 1986) is a Senegalese footballer who plays as a defender for AS Dakar Sacré Cœur and the Senegal women's national team.

International career
Sy capped for Senegal at senior level during the 2018 Africa Women Cup of Nations qualification.

References

1986 births
Living people
Women's association football defenders
Senegalese women's footballers
Senegal women's international footballers